Goodenia modesta is a species of flowering plant in the family Goodeniaceae and is endemic to central Australia. It is an erect perennial herb with leaves lance-shaped in outline at the base of the plant, and racemes or thyrses of yellow flowers.

Description
Leaves on the stem are smaller.

Taxonomy and naming
Goodenia modesta was described in 1912 by John McConnell Black in Transactions and Proceedings of the Royal Society of South Australia. The specific epithet (modesta) means "modest or unassuming".

Distribution and habitat
This goodenia grows in red loam and sand with Acacia aneura and on hummock grassland in central Australia, in the states of Western Australia, the Northern Territory and South Australia.

Conservation status
Goodenia modesta is classified as of "least concern" under the Northern Territory Government Territory Parks and Wildlife Conservation Act 1976 but as "Priority Three" by the Government of Western Australia Department of Parks and Wildlife meaning that it is poorly known and known from only a few locations but is not under imminent threat.

References

modesta
Eudicots of Western Australia
Flora of South Australia
Flora of the Northern Territory
Plants described in 1912
Taxa named by John McConnell Black
Endemic flora of Australia